Hilde Drexler (born in Vienna on 1 December 1983) is an Austrian judoka. At the 2012 Summer Olympics she competed in the Women's 63 kg, but was defeated in the second round.

References

External links
 

Austrian female judoka
1983 births
Living people
Olympic judoka of Austria
Judoka at the 2012 Summer Olympics
Sportspeople from Vienna
Universiade medalists in judo
Universiade bronze medalists for Austria
European Games competitors for Austria
Judoka at the 2015 European Games
Medalists at the 2007 Summer Universiade
20th-century Austrian women
21st-century Austrian women